Konstantina Katsaiti  (born 17 May 1980) is a Greek football defender who played for the Greece women's national football team. She competed at the 2004 Summer Olympics. At the club level, she played for Aegina.

See also
 Greece at the 2004 Summer Olympics

References

External links
 
 

1980 births
Living people
Greek women's footballers
Place of birth missing (living people)
Footballers at the 2004 Summer Olympics
Olympic footballers of Greece
Women's association football defenders
Greece women's international footballers